Gurukula Patasala also Andhra Pradesh Residential School is a boarding school run by the Government of Andhra Pradesh. The student live amongst their peers from 5th grade to 10th grade. In Gurukuls students learn in traditional way like the way in which pandits studied in ashrams. They are rich in heritage.

The school's performance is among the best in the state with over 98% pass percentage in SSC exams in 2013 with over 144 schools securing 100%.

List of schools
 Gurukula Patasala, Gparahanabegumarikapadu
 Saangika Sankshema Gurukula Patasala, Ibrahimpatnam
 Gurukula Patasala, Shadnagar
 Gurukula Patasala, Thanelanka, Amalapuram
 Gurukula Patasala, Gorantla
 Gurukula Patasala, Machilipatnam
 Gurukula Patasala, Vaddemanu, Kadapa
 Andhra Pradesh Residential School, Sarvail
 Andhra Pradesh Residential School, Kodigenahalli
 Andhra Pradesh Residential School, Tadikonda
 Saangika Sankshema Gurukula Patasala, Manchiral
 Andhra Pradesh Residential School, Nagarjuna Sagar

References

Boarding schools in Andhra Pradesh
Government of Andhra Pradesh
Educational institutions established in 1972
1972 establishments in Andhra Pradesh